Pennant Hills Demons is an Australian rules football club competing in the Sydney AFL Premier League and based out of the Sydney suburb of Pennant Hills. Their home ground moved from Ern Holmes Oval in April 2011 to Mike Kenny Oval

History
The club was formed in 1971. Pennant Hills were promoted to the top Sydney grade, the SFL (now Sydney AFL Premier Division) in 1977.

The club has won the Sydney Premier Division premiership 5 times.

Their first was won in 2000, when the Demons defeated North Shore 15.12 (102) to 12.7 (79) at Macquarie University.

Their second was in 2006, at Henson Park. The Demons scored eight behinds in a row to defeat the previously undefeated East Coast Eagles by two points. Pennant Hills 5.20 (50) East Coast Eagles 7.6 (48)

The third flag in 2008 again came against East Coast Eagles, with a record 104-point win also at Henson Park. Pennant Hills 20.12 (132) East Coast Eagles 3.10 (28)

The Demons won again in 2015 against the highly fancied East Coast Eagles Pennant Hills 14.5 (89) East Coast Eagles 7.12 (54). This was the third time the two clubs had played off in the final game of the season, with all three being played at Henson Park and all three going the way of the demons.

The most recent flag was in 2017 against the highly rated Sydney University side. The Demons finished in 5th place on the ladder in the regular season, and are the first club to win from that position, taking out the match by 6 points in a thrilling game at Blacktown International Sports park. Final score Sydney Uni 7.18 (60) to Pennant Hills 10.6 (66)

Notable players
 Lenny Hayes -  (2010 Norm Smith Medallist)
 Jackson Ferguson - 
 Mark McVeigh - 
 Jarrad McVeigh - 
 Kieren Jack - 
 Brandon Jack - 
 David Brown - 
 Braeden Campbell - 
 Stefan Carey -  , 
 Adam Chatfield - 
 Terry Thripp - .
 Kieren Briggs - 
 James Peatling - 
 Mark Sheather -

References

External links

 Official Website
 UPDATE: The greatest NSW team of all time revealed

Australian rules football clubs in Sydney
1971 establishments in Australia
Australian rules football clubs established in 1971